Aleksei Dronov is a Russian amateur boxer who won gold medals at the 2018 Youth Olympics, Youth World Championships, and European Youth Championships, all in the super-heavyweight division.

References

External links

Living people
Year of birth missing (living people)
Date of birth missing (living people)
Russian male boxers
Super-heavyweight boxers
Boxers at the 2018 Summer Youth Olympics
Medalists at the 2018 Summer Youth Olympics
Youth Olympic gold medalists for Russia